Denis Lemi Zakaria Lako Lado (born 20 November 1996) is a Swiss professional footballer who plays as a defensive midfielder for Premier League club Chelsea, on loan from Serie A club Juventus, and the Switzerland national team.

Club career

Servette 
Born in Geneva, Switzerland, to Congolese/South Sudanese parents, Zakaria first began playing for local club Servette.

Young Boys
Zakaria joined Young Boys in June 2015 for an undisclosed fee, signing a four-year contract. He made his Swiss Super League debut on 18 July 2015 against FC Zürich in 1–1 away draw replacing Alexander Gerndt after 79 minutes.

Borussia Mönchengladbach
In June 2017, Zakaria signed a five-year contract with Borussia Mönchengladbach. He was transferred as a replacement for Mahmoud Dahoud who left the club for Borussia Dortmund. The transfer fee paid to Young Boys for Zakaria was reported as €10 million.
Zakaria scored a total of 11 goals in 125 appearances for Borussia Mönchengladbach.

Juventus
On 31 January 2022, with six months remaining on his contract, Zakaria moved to Serie A club Juventus on a four-and-a-half-year contract, in a deal worth €8.6 million. On 6 February, Zakaria scored on his debut in the 61st minute, helping his side beat Hellas Verona 2–0.

Loan to Chelsea
On 1 September 2022, Zakaria was loaned to Premier League club Chelsea until the end of the 2022–23 season with an option of a permanent transfer at the end of the season.
On 2 November 2022, Zakaria made his Chelsea debut in the club's final UEFA Champions League group stage match, scoring the winning goal of a 2–1 victory against Dinamo Zagreb.

International career
Zakaria played for various Swiss youth national teams. He could have represented either Switzerland, South Sudan or Congo at a senior level due to being born in Switzerland and having a South Sudanese mother and a Congolese father.

Zakaria made his debut for the senior Switzerland national team in a friendly 2–1 loss to Belgium on 28 May 2016. He was part of the squad for the 2016 European Championships. Zakaria was included in the 23-man squad for the 2018 FIFA World Cup.

In May 2019, Zakaria played in the 2019 UEFA Nations League Finals, where his team finished fourth. He was named in the 26-man Swiss squad for the UEFA Euro 2020. On 2 July 2021, he scored an own goal in Switzerland's quarter-final match against Spain, which they went on to lose on penalties.

Style of play
Due to his characteristics and playing style has led  Zakaria to be compared with former France international Patrick Vieira as well as Paul Pogba. Zakaria has been described as a midfield powerhouse due to his pace, strength, athleticism and aggressive playing style. He is also known for being a composed passer and for making surging forward runs from midfield. Primarily a defensive midfielder, he is also capable of playing as a central midfielder, in a holding role, or a box-to-box role, and has even played as a central defender.

Career statistics

Club

International

Scores and results list Switzerland's goal tally first, score column indicates score after each Zakaria goal.

Honours
Individual
Swiss Super League Team of the Year: 2016–17
Swiss Super League Young Player of the Year: 2016–17

References

External links
 
 

1996 births
Living people
Footballers from Geneva
Swiss people of Democratic Republic of the Congo descent
Swiss people of South Sudanese descent
Swiss men's footballers
Association football midfielders
Servette FC players
BSC Young Boys players
Borussia Mönchengladbach players
Juventus F.C. players
Chelsea F.C. players
Swiss Super League players
Swiss Challenge League players
Bundesliga players
Serie A players
Premier League players
Switzerland youth international footballers
Switzerland under-21 international footballers
Switzerland international footballers
UEFA Euro 2016 players
2018 FIFA World Cup players
UEFA Euro 2020 players
2022 FIFA World Cup players
Swiss expatriate footballers
Swiss expatriate sportspeople in Germany
Swiss expatriate sportspeople in Italy
Swiss expatriate sportspeople in England
Expatriate footballers in Germany
Expatriate footballers in Italy
Expatriate footballers in England